"I Seen a Man Die", also known as "I Never Seen a Man Cry", is the first single released from Scarface's third album, The Diary. Produced by N.O. Joe, Mike Dean and Scarface himself, "I Seen a Man Die" became a top 40 hit on the Billboard Hot 100, the first of two that Scarface had in his career. It peaked at 37 on the Billboard Hot 100. The song is a tale of a young male released from prison after seven years looking for a better life only to get caught up on the crime side again and robbed by his enemies. He dies in the hospital, regretful of his life decisions. The song also has a music video released that mirrors Scarface's lyrics.

Track listing

A-Side
"I Never Seen a Man Cry" (Radio Version)- 4:30  
"I Never Seen a Man Cry" (Instrumental)- 4:30

B-Side
"G's" (LP Version)- 4:47  
"G's" (Instrumental)- 4:47

Charts

Weekly charts

Year-end charts

References

1994 singles
Scarface (rapper) songs
G-funk songs
Songs about death
1994 songs